Fred Hill (13 May 1927 – 27 May 2020) was an Australian rules footballer who played with North Melbourne in the Victorian Football League (VFL).

Notes

External links 
 
 
 Fred Hill, at The VFA Project.

1927 births
2020 deaths
Australian rules footballers from Victoria (Australia)
Coburg Football Club players
North Melbourne Football Club players